Identity Crisis is the eighth studio album by Shelby Lynne, released in 2003.  It has a blues and traditional rock sound.

Critical reception

According to Metacritic, Identity Crisis holds a score of 83 out of 100, indicating "Universal acclaim".

Tom Jurek of AllMusic writes, "Identity Crisis is a deeply focused yet wildly adventurous look at American roots and popular musics as processed by Lynne, who is in top songwriting, vocal, and production shape here"

Matt Cibula of PopMatters writes, "this is exactly 40 minutes of transcendent music by someone who we always knew was one of the best singers and songwriters on the scene, but someone who we were afraid was never going to make the music she should be making. Well, she's done it, she did it, she dealt with the demons she needed to deal with, and she poured the rest into these death-defying songs"

Maud Hand reviews the album for BBC and writes, "On Identity Crisis Lynne returns to her country roots, yet she's still grappling with her musical identity. She borrows freely from soul, blues, gospel and vintage rock 'n' roll leaving me wondering if it's all too derivative." She goes on to say, "The more I listen the more Lynne's stylish yet simple close mic'd sound pleases."

Track listing

Personnel
Shelby Lynne - acoustic guitar, electric guitar, lead vocals, background vocals
Larry Antonino - upright bass
Jon Button - upright bass
George Del Barrio - string arrangements
Bill Payne - Fender Rhodes, Hammond organ, piano, Wurlitzer
Kevin Ricard - percussion
Oren Waters - background vocals
Maxine Williard Waters - background vocals

References

External links
Shelby Lynne Official Site
Capitol Records Official Site

Shelby Lynne albums
2003 albums
Capitol Records Nashville albums